Villarreal Club de Fútbol "C" is the third team of Villarreal CF, a Spanish football team based in Villarreal, in the autonomous community of Valencia. Founded in 2002, and plays in Tercera Federación – Group 6, holding home games at Ciudad Deportiva Villarreal CF, with a capacity of 5,000 seats.

The team must play at least one division below Villarreal CF B, who must themselves play one division lower than the main Villarreal club. Neither reserve team can enter the Copa del Rey.

Season to season

14 seasons in Tercera División
2 seasons in Tercera Federación

Players

Current squad
.

From Youth Academy

Out on loan

Coaching staff

   Saúl Fernández

References

External links
Official website 
Futbolme team profile 

Football clubs in the Valencian Community
Association football clubs established in 2002
Spanish reserve football teams
Villarreal CF
2002 establishments in Spain